The right of abode is an individual's freedom from immigration control in a particular country.  A person who has the right of abode in a country does not need permission from the government to enter the country and can live and work there without restriction, and is immune from removal and deportation (unless the right of abode has been revoked).

Generally, in order to have the right of abode in a certain country, a person must be a citizen of that country. However, some countries grant the right of abode for qualified non-citizens. This is distinct with the commonly-called right to land, right to live or right of residence, e.g. with permanent residency of the country generally have a de facto right of residence, but it can be revoked in certain circumstances (unlike a citizenship which can only be revoked in very limited circumstances such as fraud or national security concern), for example for being convicted of crimes, or in some countries, prolonged absence from it, and in many cases, such persons are not free from the immigration control.

EU, EEA, and the Schengen Agreement
Citizens of the European Economic Area (the European Union plus Iceland, Liechtenstein, and Norway) and Switzerland enjoy the freedom to travel to, live in, and work in any participating country without needing a work permit or visa, although transitory dispositions may restrict the rights of citizens of new member states to work in other countries. This is defined by the Directive 2004/38/EC on the right to move and reside freely.

However, rights to live in another EU/EEA state are not absolute. To reside in another EU/EEA state, one must either be working, job-hunting, a student, or otherwise have sufficient financial resources and health insurance to ensure they do not become a burden on the social services of the host country. States may also require nationals of other EU/EEA states to register their presence with the authorities after a certain period of time. EU/EEA states may deport nationals of other EU/EEA states and issue exclusion orders against them on grounds of public policy, public security, or public health. For example, those who commit serious crimes or come to rely on welfare may be deported. However, those subjected to such exclusion orders must be able to appeal them after a maximum period of three years, as per EU regulations. Under no circumstances can an EU/EEA state exclude a national of another EU/EEA state for life.

Any EU/EEA national who completes a five-year period of uninterrupted legal residence in another EU/EEA state becomes eligible for permanent residence, after which their presence is no longer subjected to any conditions, and they may apply for benefits that would previously have been grounds for removal, such as welfare. Permanent residency can only be revoked after a two-year absence.

Schengen Agreement
Nearly all EU/EEA countries are part of the Schengen Area; a group of countries that have signed the Schengen Agreement, which abolishes border controls between participating states, although it allows border controls to be temporarily set up in exceptional circumstances. The EEA countries and Switzerland have signed the Schengen treaty. Several of the new member states have not yet fully implemented it.

However, a few European countries require all persons to carry an identity card or passport and proof of nationality is normally required to take up residence in any member state. Thus, while the Schengen Agreement facilitates the movement of persons across frontiers, it makes no substantive difference to residence rights.

Nordic Passport Union
The Nordic Passport Union gives the citizens of Nordic countries the right to freely travel to and reside in other Nordic countries without a passport or residence permit.

Gulf Cooperation Council
Citizens of member states of the Gulf Cooperation Council (GCC) have freedom of movement throughout the GCC, including the right to reside and work in other GCC states with almost no restrictions.

Hong Kong

Taiwan

Common Travel Area

The Common Travel Area (CTA) consists of the United Kingdom, Republic of Ireland, and the UK's surrounding island territories. British and Irish citizens can move freely throughout the CTA without a passport and only minimal identity documents, and are subject to virtually no immigration controls. Citizens of both countries enjoy the right to live and work throughout the CTA with minimal restriction.

Deportation of British or Irish citizens
Unlike other EU/EEA nationals, Irish citizens who move to the UK are granted a "settled status", a status that goes beyond indefinite leave to remain. Irish nationals eligible for deportation are treated more leniently than other EU/EEA nationals, and are not automatically subjected to deportation procedures when convicted of crimes, as Parliament has considered "the close historical, community and political ties between the United Kingdom and Ireland, along with the existence of the Common Travel Area." Irish citizens are therefore legally subject to deportation from the UK only where recommended by a court in sentencing or in exceptional circumstances where that deportation is in the public interest.

Irish law provides similar protections for British citizens. British citizens are virtually exempt from deportation from Ireland, and are almost never treated as foreigners by law, although there are exceptions to this rule.

Commonwealth citizens in the UK
In addition, some nationals of member states of the Commonwealth of Nations are considered Commonwealth citizens, and have various rights in other Commonwealth countries, including the UK, such as the right-of-abode and the right to vote. In addition, British subjects born before 1984 have the right-of-abode.

If a person has a British mother and was born before 1984 then under section 2(1)(b) of the Immigration Act 1971 they are considered to have the same rights as a British citizen. The right-of-abode is conferred automatically on such persons and they are issued a certificate on their passport.

Under exceptions in section 7 of the Immigration Act 1971, a long-term resident Irish or Commonwealth citizen in the UK is granted immunity from deportation, similar to British or other Commonwealth citizens who hold right-of-abode by virtue of a residency term of at least five years in the United Kingdom. These exceptions do not apply to other nationalities with leave to remain in the United Kingdom.

British Overseas Territories

All British Overseas Territories operate their own immigration controls which apply to British citizens as well as to those from other countries.  These territories generally have local immigration laws regulating who has belonger status in that territory.

United Kingdom

Canada

Under the constitution, all Canadian citizens have the right to enter and remain in the country. Permanent residents are also conferred the right to reside and pursue a livelihood in any province or territory without restriction. This makes permanent residents the only foreign citizens with right of abode. However, permanent residents can also face revocation of this status under the Immigration and Refugee Protection Act.

De facto right of abode

The nationality laws of many countries allow foreign citizens to reside permanently in the country without seeking citizenship. This status is usually accorded following application and selection based on a variety of criteria. In Australia, Canada, New Zealand and the United States among others, foreign residents who have the right to reside permanently in the country are given the legal definition of designation of "permanent resident". Although not conferring all the rights and privileges of citizenship, it allows such individuals to enter freely as well as to take advantage of social programs and other services offered to citizens. Nonetheless, this still remains a "de facto" form of right of abode because it can be revoked in accordance with the law.

Full permanent resident

This includes cases where there is access to citizenship:

 New Zealand grants Australian citizens/permanent residents full permanent resident rights in New Zealand.
 The United Kingdom and Ireland grant automatic permanent residency to each other's citizens.
 Full permanent residency rights exist between the countries of the Nordic Council (Norway, Sweden, Finland, Denmark and Iceland).

As long-term temporary residents

In these cases there is a right of residence but without access to full citizenship rights:

 New Zealand citizens in Australia, but since 2001, Australia grants only limited rights.
 Citizens of EEA member states and Switzerland living in each other's country (except the cases above).
 Most citizens of the Federated States of Micronesia (FSM), the Republic of the Marshall Islands (RMI) and the Republic of Palau may live and work in the United States, and most U.S. citizens and their spouses may live and work in those states under a Compact of Free Association with the United States.

See also

Belonger status
Common Travel Area
Free movement of workers
Nationality law
Permanent residency
Right of return
Schengen Treaty

References

Leonard, Thomas M.: Encyclopedia of the Developing World

External links
UK Home Office guide to right of abode
Right of Union citizens and their family members to move and reside freely within the territory of the Member States
http://untreaty.un.org/unts/1_60000/5/32/00009566.pdf

Human migration